A lance is a spear designed to be used by a mounted warrior or cavalry soldier (lancer). In ancient and medieval warfare, it evolved into the leading weapon in cavalry charges, and was unsuited for throwing or for repeated thrusting, unlike similar weapons of the javelin and pike family typically used by infantry. Lances were often equipped with a vamplate, a small circular plate to prevent the hand sliding up the shaft upon impact, and beginning in the late 14th century were used in conjunction with a lance rest attached to the breastplate. Though best known as a military and sporting weapon carried by European knights and men-at-arms, the use of lances was widespread throughout Asia, the Middle East, and North Africa wherever suitable mounts were available. Lancers of the medieval period also carried secondary weapons such as swords, battle axes, war hammers, maces and daggers for use in hand-to-hand combat, since the lance was often a one-use-per-engagement weapon; assuming the lance survived the initial impact without breaking, it was often (depending on the lance) too long, heavy, and slow to be effective against opponents in a melee.

Etymology

The name is derived from the word  — the Roman auxiliaries' javelin or throwing spear; although according to the OED, the word may be of Iberian origin. Also compare , a Greek term for "spear" or "lance".

A lance in the original sense is a light throwing spear or javelin. The English verb to launch "fling, hurl, throw" is derived from the term (via Old French ), as well as the rarer or poetic to lance. The term from the 17th century came to refer specifically to spears not thrown, used for thrusting by heavy cavalry, and especially in jousting. The longer types of thrusting spear used by infantry are usually referred to as pikes.

History of use

Middle Ages
The Byzantine cavalry used lances (kontos or kontarion) almost exclusively, often in mixed formations of mounted archer and lancer formations (cursores et defensores). The Byzantines used lances in both overarm and underarm grips, as well as being couched under the arm (held horizontally).

Formations of knights were known to use underarm-couched military lances in full-gallop closed-ranks charges against lines of opposing infantry or cavalry. Two variants on the couched lance charge developed, the French method, en haie, with lancers in a double line, and the German method, with lancers drawn up in a deeper formation which was often wedge-shaped. It is commonly believed that this became the dominant European cavalry tactic in the 11th century after the development of the cantled saddle and stirrups (the Great Stirrup Controversy), and of rowel spurs (which enabled better control of the mount). Cavalry thus outfitted and deployed had a tremendous collective force in their charge, and could shatter most contemporary infantry lines.

Because of the extreme stopping power of a thrusting spear, it quickly became a popular weapon of infantry in the Late Middle Ages. These eventually led to the rise of the longest type of spears, the pike. This adaptation of the cavalry lance to infantry use was largely tasked with stopping lance-armed cavalry charges. During the 14th, 15th, and 16th centuries, these weapons, both mounted and unmounted, were so effective that lancers and pikemen not only became a staple of every Western army, but also became highly sought-after mercenaries. (However, the pike had already been used by Philip II of Macedon in antiquity to great effect, in the form of the sarissa.)

In Europe, a jousting lance was a variation of the knight's lance which was modified from its original war design. In jousting, the lance tips would usually be blunt, often spread out like a cup or furniture foot, to provide a wider impact surface designed to unseat the opposing rider without spearing him through. The centre of the shaft of such lances could be designed to be hollow, in order for it to break on impact, as a further safeguard against impalement. These are the versions that can most often be seen at medieval reenactment festivals. In war, lances were much more like stout spears, long and balanced for one-handed use, and with sharpened tips.

Lance (unit organization)

As a small unit that surrounded a knight when he went into battle during the 14th and 15th centuries, a lance might have consisted of one or two squires, the knight himself, one to three men-at-arms, and possibly an archer. Lances were often combined under the banner of a higher-ranking nobleman to form companies of knights that would act as an ad hoc unit.

17th and 18th century decline in Western Europe
The advent of wheellock technology spelled the end of the lance in Western Europe, with newer types of heavy cavalry such as reiters and cuirassiers spurning the old one-use weapon and increasingly supplanting the older gendarme type Medieval cavalry. While many Renaissance captains such as Sir Roger Williams continued to espouse the virtues of the lance, many such as François de la Noue openly encouraged its abandonment in the face of the pistol's greater armor piercing power, handiness and greater general utility. At the same time the adoption of pike and shot tactic by most infantry forces would neuter much of the power of the lancer's breakneck charge, making them a non-cost effective type of military unit due to their expensive horses in comparison to cuirassiers and reiters, who usually charging only at a trot could make do with lower quality mounts. After the success of pistol-armed Huguenot heavy horse against their Royalist counterparts during the French Wars of Religion, most Western European powers started rearming their lancers with pistols, initially as an adjunct weapon and eventually as a replacement, with the Spanish retaining the lance the longest.

Only the Polish–Lithuanian Commonwealth with its far greater emphasis on cavalry warfare, large population of Szlachta nobility and general lower military technology level among its foes retained the lance to a considerable degree, with the famously winged Polish hussars having their glory period during the 17th and 18th centuries against a wide variety of enemy forces.

Indigenous use in North America
After the Western introduction of the horse to the Native Americans, the Plains Indians also took up the lance, probably independently, as American cavalry of the time were pistol and sabre armed, firing forward at full gallop.

19th century revival in Western Europe
The mounted lancer experienced a renaissance in the 19th century. This followed on the demise of the pike and of body armor during the early 18th century, with the reintroduction of lances coming from Poland and Hungary. In both countries formations of lance-armed cavalry had been retained when they disappeared elsewhere in Europe. Lancers became especially prevalent during and after the Napoleonic Wars: a period when almost all the major European powers reintroduced the lance into their respective cavalry arsenals. The lance was usually employed in initial charges in close formation, with sabers being used in the melee that followed.

The Crimean War saw the use of the lance in the Charge of the Light Brigade. One of the four British regiments involved in the charge, plus the Russian Cossacks who counter-attacked, were armed with this weapon.

During the War of the Triple Alliance (1864–70), the Paraguayan cavalry made effective use of locally manufactured lances, both of conventional design and of an antique pattern used by gauchos for cattle herding.

The 1860s and 1870s saw the increasing common usage of ash, bamboo, beech, or pine wood for lance shafts of varying lengths, each with steel points and butts, adopted by the uhlan regiments of the Saxon, Württemberg, Bavarian, and Prussian armies.

Twilight of use

The Franco-Prussian War of 1870 saw the extensive deployment of cavalry armed with lances on both sides. While the opportunities for using this weapon effectively proved infrequent during the actual conflict, the entire cavalry corps (hussars, dragoons, cuirassiers, and uhlans) of the post-war Imperial German Army subsequently adopted the lance as a primary weapon. After 1893 the standard German cavalry lance was made of drawn tubular steel, covered with clear lacquer and with a hemp hand-grip. At  it was the longest version then in use.

The Austrian cavalry had included regiments armed with lances since 1784. In 1884 the lance ceased to be carried either as an active service or parade weapon. However the eleven Uhlan regiments continued in existence until 1918, armed with the standard cavalry sabre.

During the Second Boer War, British troops successfully used the lance on one occasion - against retreating Boers at the Battle of Elandslaagte (21 October 1899). However, the Boers made effective use of trench warfare, rapid-fire field artillery, continuous-fire machine guns, and accurate long-range repeating rifles from the beginning of the war. The combined effect was devastating, so much of the British cavalry was deployed as mounted infantry, dismounting to fight on foot. For some years after the Boer War, the six British lancer regiments officially carried the lance only for parades and other ceremonial duties. At the regimental level, training in the use of the lance continued, ostensibly to improve recruit riding skills. In 1909, the  bamboo or ash lance with a steel head was reauthorized for general use on active service.

The Russian cavalry (except for the Cossacks) discarded the lance in the late 19th century, but in 1907, it was reissued for use by the front line of each squadron when charging in open formation. In its final form, the Russian lance was a long metal tube with a steel head and leather arm strap. It was intended as a shock weapon in the charge, to be dropped after impact and replaced by the sword for close combat in a melee. While demoralizing to an opponent, the lance was recognized as being an awkward encumbrance in forested regions.

The relative value of the lance and the sword as a principal weapon for mounted troops was an issue of dispute in the years immediately preceding World War I. Opponents of the lance argued that the weapon was clumsy, conspicuous, easily deflected, and inefficient in a melee. Arguments favoring the retention of the lance focused on the impact on morale of having charging cavalry preceded by "a hedge of steel" and on the effectiveness of the weapon against fleeing opponents.

World War I and after

Lances were still in use by the British, Turkish, Italian, Spanish, French, Belgian, Indian, German, and Russian armies at the outbreak of World War I. In initial cavalry skirmishes in France this antique weapon proved ineffective, German uhlans being "hampered by their long lances and a good many threw them away". A major action involving repeated charges by four regiments of German cavalry, all armed with lances, at Halen on 12 August 1914 was unsuccessful. Amongst the Belgian defenders was one regiment of lancers who fought dismounted.

With the advent of trench warfare, lances and the cavalry that carried them ceased to play a significant role. A Russian cavalry officer whose regiment carried lances throughout the war recorded only one instance where an opponent was killed by this weapon.

The Greco-Turkish War of 1919-22 saw an unexpected revival of lances amongst the cavalry of the Turkish National Army. During the successful Turkish offensives of the final stages of the war across the open plains of Asia Minor, Turkish mounted troops were armed with bamboo shafted-lances taken from military storage and inflicted heavy losses on the retreating Greek Army. 
 
The cavalry branches of most armies which still retained lances as a service weapon at the end of World War I generally discarded them for all but ceremonial occasions during the 1920s and 1930s. There were exceptions during this era, such as the Polish cavalry, which retained the lance for combat use until either 1934 or 1937, but contrary to popular legend did not make use of it in World War II. The German cavalry retained the lance (the Stahlrohrlanze) as a service weapon until 1927, as did the British cavalry until 1928. The Argentine cavalry were documented as carrying lances until the 1940s, but this appears to have been used as part of recruit riding school training, rather than serious preparation for active service.

Use as flagstaff
The United States Cavalry used a lance-like shaft as a flagstaff.

Mounted police use
When the Canadian North-West Mounted Police was established, it was modeled after certain British cavalry units that used lances. It made limited use of this weapon in small detachments during the 1870s, intended to impress indigenous peoples.

The modern Royal Canadian Mounted Police, the North-West Mounted Police's descendant, employs ceremonial, though functional, lances made of male bamboo. They feature a crimped swallowtail pennant, red above and white below.

The New South Wales Mounted Police, based at Redfern Barracks, Sydney, Australia, carry a lance with a navy blue and white pennant on ceremonial occasions.

Other weapons
"Lance" is also the name given by some anthropologists to the light flexible javelins (technically darts) thrown by atlatls (spear-throwing sticks), but these are usually called "atlatl javelins". Some were not much larger than arrows, and were typically feather-fletched like an arrow and unlike the vast majority of spears and javelins (one exception would be several instances of the many types of ballista bolt, a mechanically-thrown spear).

A "tilting-spear" is a heraldric term for a lance.

See also
Tent pegging

References

Further reading
Delbrück, Hans. History of the Art of War, originally published in 1920; University of Nebraska Press (reprint), 1990 (trans. J. Renfroe Walter). Volume III: Medieval Warfare.

External links

From Lance to Pistol: The Evolution of Mounted Soldiers from 1550 to 1600 (myArmoury.com article)

 
Hunting equipment
Spears